Luke Woodhouse (born 13 October 1988) is an English professional darts player who plays in Professional Darts Corporation (PDC) events.

Known as "Woody", he won a PDC Challenge Tour event in 2013.

World Championship results

PDC
 2020: Third round (lost to Dimitri Van den Bergh 2–4)
 2021: First round (lost to Jamie Lewis 2–3)
 2022: Second round (lost to Damon Heta 1–3)
 2023: Second round (lost to Gerwyn Price 1–3)

Performance timeline

PDC European Tour

References

External links

1988 births
Living people
English darts players
People from Bewdley
Professional Darts Corporation current tour card holders
Sportspeople from Worcestershire